Hsu Ming-tsai (born 13 June 1953) is a Taiwanese politician. He served as the mayor of Hsinchu City from 20 December 2009 until 25 December 2014.

Early life
Hsu obtained his bachelor's degree in tourism management from Chinese Culture University, master's degree in public administration from Dominican University in Illinois, United States and doctoral degree in technology management from Chung Hua University.

Hsinchu City Mayoralty

Hsinchu City Mayoralty election
Hsu assumed the position of Mayor of Hsinchu City starting 20 December 2009 after winning the 2009 Republic of China local election on 5 December 2009 under the Kuomintang.

HKETCO Director visit to Hsinchu City
On 25 June 2013, Hsu received John Leung, the Director of the Hong Kong Economic, Trade and Cultural Office (HKETCO) in Taiwan with his colleagues. They had a meeting which were also attended by the Hsinchu Chamber of Commerce and Importers and Exporters Association of Hsinchu City.

2014 Hsinchu City mayoralty election
In 2014, Hsu joined the 2014 Republic of China local election as a Kuomintang candidate for Mayor of Hsinchu City, going against his rival Lin Chih-chien from Democratic Progressive Party and independent candidate Tsai Jen-chien. His campaign slogan was Intelligence, happiness, health and security. His campaign promises were connecting Hsinchu city to Provincial Highway 61 and Jiadong Township in Pingtung County, calling for the relocation of CPC Corporation oil reserve building for its land to be used as the new city government center and city council building, relocating the urban center and turn the old town area into a historical and cultural tourist area, building an off-ramp from the Wuyang Expressway to Hsinchu City center, establishing a hospital for women and children and expanding the Hsinchu City branch of the National Taiwan University Hospital. Hsu however lost to DPP candidate Lin Chih-chien.

2018 Hsinchu City mayoralty election

References

External links
 

1953 births
Living people
Chinese Culture University alumni
Dominican University (Illinois) alumni
Kuomintang politicians in Taiwan
Mayors of Hsinchu